Phillip Scott (born 16 August 1952 in Sydney) is an Australian actor, singer, pianist, writer and comedian.

Career

He has appeared on film as well as in sketch comedy television programs.  His television appearances include The Dingo Principle and Three Men and a Baby Grand, satirical sketch television comedy programs for which he was a writer/performer with Jonathan Biggins and Drew Forsythe. He also appeared with Max Gillies in The Gillies Report and its sequels, The Gillies Republic and Gillies and Company, and was a writer/performer on ABC TV's The Big Gig and a regular writer for Good News Week.

He (wrote the music for, played piano) and Max Gillies starred in "Night of National Reconciliation" during 1983 at Kinselas, Taylor Square, Darlinghurst, Sydney.

From 2000 to 2017 he co-wrote, composed and performed as an actor/musician in the award-winning Wharf Revue series of political satirical revues for the Sydney Theatre Company, including Free Petrol, Sunday in Iraq with George, Much Revue About Nothing, Pennies from Kevin and Open for Business. Other cabaret shows include The Twink and the Showgirl with Vincent Hooper, and co-writing script (with Dean Bryant) and musical arrangements for the bio-show Newley Discovered which premiered at the Adelaide Cabaret Festival in 2009 and starred Hugh Sheridan. Phillip co-created several shows with singer/actor Trevor Ashley, including Gentlemen Prefer Blokes, Fat Swan, Little Orphan Trashley, and the tribute shows Diamonds Are For Trevor and Liza's Back (Is Broken). His recent cabaret shows (as writer and performer) are Mario, about the life and music of Mario Lanza, with Blake Bowden, and Reviewing the Situation, about the English songwriter Lionel Bart. The latter show was co-written and directed by Terence O'Connell, and was nominated for a Helpmann Award in 2016.

His musical theatre writing credits (as composer and/or co-writer) include Safety in Numbers for the Q Theatre and Ensemble Theatre, a new libretto of Orpheus in the Underworld for Opera Australia (2003, revised 2015), and the AWGIE Award-winning musical The Republic of Myopia (2004). The Sydney Theatre Company production of The Republic of Myopia starred Helen Dallimore, Tamsin Carroll and Simon Gleeson. He was script consultant on the book of Priscilla, Queen of the Desert – the Stage Musical (2006). He also wrote music and lyrics for Monkey Baa Theatre Company's children shows Pearlie in the Park (based on the book by Wendy Harmer), Millie and Jack and the Dancing Cat, and Pete the Sheep (based on the book by Jackie French). Another upcoming Jackie French adaptation, Josephine Wants to Dance is slated for 2018.

Scott composed the score for the 1987 feature film Those Dear Departed, for which he was nominated for an AFI Award. Scott also co-wrote the music for the miniseries Bodyline.

He has written four novels. Three have been published in the United States by Alyson Books: One Dead Diva, Gay Resort Murder Shock and Mardi Gras Murders. He has written weekly columns for Sydney's free papers SX and The Sydney Star Observer.

Scott has a music degree from the University of Sydney, and writes reviews for the international classical CD magazine Fanfare and the Australian national music magazine "Limelight".

Personal life
Scott was married and has two daughters. He has been in a relationship with his partner Michael for over twenty years. His elder daughter, Dr. Phoebe Scott, is a curator at the National Gallery of Singapore. His younger daughter, Georgie Scott, is an actress.

References

External links
 

1952 births
Australian male stage actors
Australian male film actors
Australian male television actors
Australian male musical theatre actors
Australian pianists
Australian male comedians
Australian male composers
Australian composers
Australian male singers
Australian male novelists
Living people
Male actors from Sydney
Australian musical theatre composers
Australian LGBT singers
Male pianists
21st-century pianists
21st-century Australian male musicians
21st-century Australian musicians
Musicians from Sydney